Helmstedt is a railway station located in Helmstedt, Germany. The station is located on the Brunswick–Magdeburg railway. The train services are operated by Deutsche Bahn.

Train services
The following services currently call at the station:

Intercity services (IC 56) Norddeich - Emden - Oldenburg - Bremen - Hannover - Braunschweig - Magdeburg - Halle - Leipzig(/Cottbus)
Local services  Braunschweig - Helmstedt - Magdeburg - Burg

References

Railway stations in Lower Saxony
Buildings and structures in Helmstedt (district)